The Carlos Palanca Memorial Awards for Literature winners in the year 1977 are listed in this article.

English division
Short story
First prize: “Janis Joplin, The Revolution and the Melancholy Widow of Gabriela Silang Street” by Gregorio Brillantes
Second prize: “Prodigal Season” by Rowena Tiempo Torrevillas
Third prize: “Victor and Other Issues” by Paul Stephen Lim

Poetry
First prize: “Moses and Other Poems” by Domingo De Guzman; and “Stonehenge and Other Poems” by Edwardo Orozco
Second prize: “A Filigree of Seasons” by Tita Lacambra Ayala; and “Foliage and Tiger Fire and Other Poems” by Edgardo B. Maranan
Third prize: “Gin Tonic” by Edel Garcellano; and “Poems” by Rita Baltazar Gaddi

One-act play
First prize: “The Reunion” by Hermibya Sison
Second prize: “Points of Departure” by Paul Stephen Lim
Third prize: “The Carpenter” by Emeterio G. Roa III

Full-length play
First prize: “The Terrorist Dialogue” by Wilfrido D. Nolledo
Second prize: No winner
Third prize: No winner
Honorable mention: “Jessy Ebon” by Manuel Cacdac; and “The Wounded Womb” by Elsa M. Coscolluela

Filipino (Tagalog) division
Short story
First prize: “Ahibay” by Hercules Del Mundo
Second prize: “Isang Kuwento ng Paraisong Walang Katapusan” by Edgardo B. Maranan
Third prize: “Lagablab ng Isang Yagit” by Benigno R. Juan

Poetry
First prize: “Sa Bibig ng Balon at Iba pang Tula” by Lamberto E. Antonio
Second prize: “Sa Pagdalaw ng Pangungulila” by Jesus Manuel Santiago
Third prize: “Maskara at Mahika” by Teo T. Antonio; and “Pagkat Tayo'y Nagmamahal” by Romulo Sandoval

One-act play
First prize: No winner
Second prize: “Magkano ka Walong Oras, Isang Araw” by Diosdado Anzures Jr.
Third prize: “Kanluran ng Buhay” by Bienvenido Noriega Jr.
Honorable mention: “Ang Huling Hibla ng Kabaliwan ni Sisa” by Rogelio Sese; “Ang Multo sa Hawla” by Lorenzo Banag; and “Ang Pagbabalik ng Musikero” by Nonilon Queano

Full-length play
First prize: “Mayo A-Biente Uno Atbp. Kabanata” by Al Santos
Second prize: “Barasoain” by Noel De Leon
Third prize: “Talambuhay” by Bienvenido Noriega Jr.

More winners by year

References
 

1977
1977 literary awards